Turning Page is a new American play written by actress Angelica Page based on her relationship as the only daughter of legendary Academy Award winning actress Geraldine Page. It was developed at the Actors Studio with a book on the same subject to follow and mentored by Patricia Bosworth. The solo play had its first public workshop production Off-Broadway in New York City at The Cherry Lane Studio Theater. It ran beginning October 11, 2012 for 18 performances with direction by Tony Award nominated Wilson Milam (The Lieutenant of Inishmore).

Art critic Rene Ricard before his death called the production "a religious experience".

Turning Page has had a subsequent workshop production in Los Angeles where it was praised in the Los Angeles Times.

References

American plays